Montri Srinaka (born 1934) is a Thai sprinter. He competed in the men's 200 metres at the 1956 Summer Olympics.

References

1934 births
Living people
Athletes (track and field) at the 1956 Summer Olympics
Montri Srinaka
Montri Srinaka
Place of birth missing (living people)
Montri Srinaka